Grandcourt is a commune in the Seine-Maritime department in the Normandy region in northern France.

Geography
A farming and forestry village which was created from five former parishes at the time of the French Revolution.

Population

Places of interest

 The church of St. Martin, dating from the eleventh century.
 The church of St. Wandrille, dating from the nineteenth century.
 Vestiges of an eleventh-century castle motte
 Grandcourt War Cemetery, containing 58 Second World War burials

See also
Communes of the Seine-Maritime department

References

Communes of Seine-Maritime